"Underdog" is the third single released from the album West Ryder Pauper Lunatic Asylum by English band Kasabian. It peaked at number 32 in the UK Singles Chart on the week after the album's release. Despite this, it became a widely popular song.

Popular culture use
"Underdog" was used in the credits of the 2010 film Takers. Snooker player Mark Selby has used "Underdog" as his walk-on music. "Underdog" is currently used as the run out music by English League One football teams Colchester United and Peterborough United, until Dave Robertson took over in February 2015, with the first match without "Underdog" being played a 2–0 win over Bradford City. The music also featured in the Carlsberg England team talk advertisement for the 2010 World Cup, as did the band themselves. During the 2011 Rugby League Four Nations, an instrumental version of the song was used as music during video referee decisions. The song was played during the fourth episode of the first series of the BBC Three sitcom Mongrels. The song, like many other Kasabian tracks, is also used in at least one episode of BBC Two's Top Gear. It was also used on a highlight video for the 2009 European Grand Prix on the official Formula 1 website.

The song was also featured on an episode of The World's Strictest Parents in Australia. "Underdog" has been used by Sony in a commercial for their BRAVIA televisions. The advert also features Real Madrid and Brazilian football player Kaká while he was with his former team AC Milan wearing their home kit.

The track is also included in the 16-track playlist of the 2009 racing simulator Need for Speed: Shift.

The song is part of the soundtrack of car racing game Asphalt 8: Airborne.

"Underdog" also features in the background of a scene in Misfits, season one, episode four.

It was also covered by international superstar Kelly Rowland during her BBC Radio 1 Live Lounge session in 2010.

It was used in the regional competition scene of the 2011 docudrama Soul Surfer, the true story of Bethany Hamilton.

This song is also used by Cancer Research UK's Race for Life campaign, appearing in television and radio advertisements, and played at the start of each event.

"Underdog" was also used as the entrance music for George Groves in his boxing match against Carl Froch at Wembley Stadium.

An instrumental version of the song is featured in Toyota Australia's television commercial that premiered in July 2016.

Track listing
Digital EP
 "Underdog" – 4:36
 "Julie & the Moth Man" – 5:38
 "Underdog (Sasha remix)" – 10:27

Personnel
 Tom Meighan – lead vocals 
 Sergio Pizzorno – guitars, synthesizers, backing vocals
 Chris Edwards – bass
 Ian Matthews – drums
 Jay Mehler – additional guitar

Music video
The music video features a live performance by the band in black and white.

Chart performance
Following the release of Kasabian's album, "Underdog" managed to enter the UK Singles Chart at number 32. However, on the single's physical release in October 2009, "Underdog" only managed to reach number 45, meaning it failed to beat its original peak of number 32.

Certifications

References

Kasabian songs
2009 singles
Songs written by Sergio Pizzorno
2009 songs
RCA Records singles
Columbia Records singles